"Hey Luv (Anything)" is the second single from Mobb Deep's Infamy album.  The song features 112 & the music video was directed by Little X.  This song is also included on the B-side of "Get Away", the group's next single. It is Mobb Deep's highest charting song to date, peaking at #58 on the Billboard Hot 100.

Track listing
Side A
"Hey Luv (Anything)" [Clean Version]

Side B
"Hey Luv (Anything)" [Dirty Version]
"Hey Luv (Anything)" [Instrumental]

Charts

Weekly charts

Year-end charts

References

2001 singles
Mobb Deep songs
2001 songs
Loud Records singles
Song recordings produced by Havoc (musician)
Songs written by Prodigy (rapper)
Songs written by Havoc (musician)